Ranatra brevicollis is a species of waterscorpion in the family Nepidae. It is found in Central America and North America.

References

Articles created by Qbugbot
Insects described in 1910
Nepidae